Borikha is a rural locality (a settlement) and the administrative center of Krasnopartizansky Selsoviet, Aleysky District, Altai Krai, Russia. The population was 538 as of 2013. There are 8 streets.

Geography 
Borikha is located 30 km southwest of Aleysk (the district's administrative centre) by road. Mamontovsky is the nearest rural locality.

References 

Rural localities in Aleysky District